George Shiras may refer to:
George Shiras, Jr.(1832–1924), Associate Justice of the U.S. Supreme Court
George Shiras III (1859–1942), U.S. Representative from Pennsylvania and son of George Shiras, Jr.